Balls Out: Gary the Tennis Coach is a 2009 American sports comedy film directed by Danny Leiner (his final film before his death in 2018) and features actor Seann William Scott as the main character and Randy Quaid in a supporting role. It was filmed mostly in Austin and Taylor, Texas, and was released direct-to-video on January 13, 2009.

Cast
 Seann William Scott as Gary "The Beast" Houseman
 Randy Quaid as Coach Lew Tuttle
 Brando Eaton as Mike Jensen
 Emilee Wallace as Jenny Tuttle
 A.D. Miles as Steve Pimble
 Leonor Varela as Norma Sanchez
 Daniel Ross as Jeffery Vanier
 Tim Williams as Dickhead Daubert
 Ryan Simpkins as Amy Daubert
 Conor Donovan as Burke Nibbons
 Allen Evangelista as Maricar Magwill
 Justin Chon as Joe Chang
 Vincent Coleman Taylor as Kevin Jones (as Vincent Taylor)
 Bryan Mitchell as Randy King
 Remington Dewan as Paul the Videographer
 Meredith Eaton as Mrs. Tuttle
 Joseph Dwyer as Tommy Tremble
 Sterling Knight as Opposing Team Tennis Player (uncredited)
 Deke Anderson as  Gil Houseman

Production
The screenplay, written by Andy Stock and Rick Stempson, won the 2005 BlueCat Screenplay Competition. The film is set in Lincoln, Nebraska, but was filmed mostly in Austin, Texas, and various locations around the city. The writers are both Lincoln East High School graduates.

References

External links
 
 

2009 comedy films
2009 direct-to-video films
2009 films
2000s sports comedy films
American sports comedy films
Films directed by Danny Leiner
Films scored by John Swihart
Films set in Nebraska
Films shot in Austin, Texas
Tennis films
2000s English-language films
2000s American films